The 2021 Collingwood Football Club season is the club's 125th season of senior competition in the Australian Football League (AFL). The club also fielded its reserves team in the Victorian Football League and women's teams in the AFL Women's and VFL Women's competitions.

Overview

Squad
 Players are listed by guernsey number, and 2021 statistics are for AFL regular season and finals series matches during the 2021 AFL season only. Career statistics include a player's complete AFL career, which, as a result, means that a player's debut and part or whole of their career statistics may be for another club. Statistics are correct as of Round 23 of the 2021 season (22 August 2021) and are taken from AFL Tables.

Squad changes

In

Out

AFL season

Pre-season matches

Regular season

Ladder

Awards & Milestones

AFL Awards
 2021 22under22 selection – Isaac Quaynor

Club Awards
  – Jack Crisp
  – Brayden Maynard
  – Scott Pendlebury
  – Jordan De Goey
  – Steele Sidebottom
  – Lachlan Tardrew
  – Jordan Roughead
  – Oliver Henry
  – Brody Mihocek
  – Steele Sidebottom

Milestones
 Round 1 – Oliver Henry (AFL debut)
 Round 1 – Callum Brown (50 games)
 Round 2 – Jordan De Goey (100 games)
 Round 3 – Beau McCreery (AFL debut)
 Round 5 – Finlay Macrae (AFL debut)
 Round 5 – Brody Mihocek (100 goals)
 Round 6 – Jay Rantall (AFL debut)
 Round 7 – Caleb Poulter (AFL debut)
 Round 8 – Steele Sidebottom (250 games)
 Round 9 – Tom Wilson (AFL debut)
 Round 10 – Jordan Roughead (50 Collingwood games)
 Round 11 – Trent Bianco (AFL debut)
 Round 11 – Darcy Moore (100 games)
 Round 16 – Josh Daicos (50 games)
 Round 16 – Jack Crisp (150 Collingwood games)
 Round 16 – Will Hoskin-Elliott (100 Collingwood goals)
 Round 17 – Will Hoskin-Elliott (100 Collingwood games)
 Round 19 – Jack Ginnivan (AFL debut)
 Round 19 – Anton Tohill (AFL debut)
 Round 22 – Josh Thomas (100 goals)
 Round 23 – Jordan Roughead (200 AFL games)

VFL season

Pre-season matches

Regular season

Finals series

Ladder

AFLW season

Pre-season matches

Regular season

Finals series

Ladder

Squad
 Players are listed by guernsey number, and 2021 statistics are for AFL Women's regular season and finals series matches during the 2021 AFL Women's season only. Career statistics include a player's complete AFL Women's career, which, as a result, means that a player's debut and part or whole of their career statistics may be for another club. Statistics are correct as of the preliminary final of the 2021 season (10 April 2021) and are taken from Australian Football.

Squad changes
In

Out

League awards
 2021 22under22 selection – Chloe Molloy (captain), Jordyn Allen, Mikala Cann
 2021 AFL Women's All-Australian team – Brianna Davey (captain), Brittany Bonnici, Chloe Molloy, Ruby Schleicher
 2021 AFL Women's best and fairest – Brianna Davey

Club Awards
 Best and fairest – Brianna Davey
 Best first year player – Tarni Brown
 Players' player award – Brianna Davey
 Leading goalkicker – Chloe Molloy (16 goals)

VFLW season

Pre-season matches
Collingwood played two VFLW practice matches prior to the start of the regular season.

Regular season

Finals series

Ladder

Notes
 Key
 H ^ Home match.
 A ^ Away match.

 Notes
Collingwood's scores are indicated in bold font.
Match was played behind closed doors due to the COVID-19 pandemic.
After the cancellation of the 18th round, due to the COVID-19 pandemic, the VFL ladder was reconfigured, since it became impossible to get all teams to the same numbers of matches for the season, and the ladder was changed to the match ratio system (with clubs ranked by percentage of matches won).

See also
 2021 Collingwood Magpies Netball season

References

External links
 Official website of the Collingwood Football Club
 Official website of the Australian Football League

2021
Collingwood Football Club
Collingwood